I Am Curious (Yellow) (meaning "I Am Curious: A Film in Yellow") is a 1967 Swedish erotic drama film written and directed by Vilgot Sjöman, starring Sjöman and Lena Nyman. It is a companion film to 1968's I Am Curious (Blue); the two were initially intended to be one  hour film.

Plot 

Director Vilgot Sjöman plans to make a social film starring his lover Lena Nyman, a young theatre student who has a strong interest in social issues.

Nyman's character, also named Lena, lives with her father in a small apartment in Stockholm and is driven by a burning passion for social justice and a need to understand the world, people and relationships. Her little room is filled with books, papers, and boxes full of clippings on topics such as "religion" and "men", and files on each of the 23 men with whom she has had sex. The walls are covered with pictures of concentration camps and a portrait of Francisco Franco, reminders of the crimes being perpetrated against humanity. She walks around Stockholm and interviews people about social classes in society, conscientious objection, gender equality, and the morality of vacationing in Franco's Spain. She and her friends also picket embassies and travel agencies. Lena's relationship with her father, who briefly went to Spain to fight Franco as part of the International Brigades, is problematic, and she is distressed by the fact that he returned from Spain for unknown reasons after only a short period.

Through her father Lena meets the slick Bill (Börje in the original Swedish), who works at a menswear shop and voted for the Rightist Party. They begin a love affair, but Lena soon finds out from her father that Bill has another woman, Marie, and a young daughter. Lena is furious that Bill has not been open with her, and goes to the country on a bicycle holiday. Alone in a cabin in the woods, she attempts an ascetic life-style, meditating, studying nonviolence and practicing yoga. Bill soon comes looking for her in his new car. She greets him with a shotgun, but they soon make love. Lena confronts Bill about Marie, and finds out about another of his lovers, Madeleine. They fight and Bill leaves. Lena has strange dreams, in which she ties two teams of soccer players – she notes that they number 23 – to a tree, shoots Bill and cuts his penis off. She also dreams of being taunted by passing drivers as she cycles down a road, until finally Martin Luther King Jr. drives up. She apologizes to him for not being strong enough to practice nonviolence.

Lena returns home, destroys her room, and goes to the car showroom where Bill works to tell him she has scabies. They are treated at a clinic, and then go their separate ways. As the embedded story of Lena and Bill begins to resolve, the film crew and director Sjöman are featured more. The relationship between Lena the actress and Bill the actor has become intimate during the production of Vilgot's film, and Vilgot is jealous and clashes with Bill. The film concludes with Lena returning Vilgot's keys as he meets with another young female theatre student.

Nonfictional content  
The film includes an interview with Dr. Martin Luther King Jr., filmed in March 1966, when King was visiting Stockholm along with Harry Belafonte with a view to starting a new initiative for Swedish support of African Americans. The film also includes an interview with then Minister of Transportation Olof Palme (later Prime Minister of Sweden), who talks about the existence of class structure in Swedish society (he was told it was for a documentary film), and footage of Russian poet Yevgeny Yevtushenko.

Cast 

 Vilgot Sjöman as Vilgot Sjöman
 Lena Nyman as Lena
 Börje Ahlstedt as Börje
 Peter Lindgren as Lena's father
 Chris Wahlström as Rune's woman
 Marie Göranzon as Marie
 Magnus Nilsson as Magnus
 Ulla Lyttkens as Ulla
 Anders Ek as Exercise leader
 Martin Luther King Jr. as himself
 Olof Palme as himself
 Yevgeny Yevtushenko as himself

Uncredited roles
 Holger Löwenadler as The King
 Bertil Norström as Factory worker
 Dora Söderberg Old lady in elevator
 Öllegård Wellton as Yevtushenko's Interpreter
 Sven Wollter as Captain

Release

Censorship
The film includes numerous and frank scenes of nudity and staged sexual intercourse. One particularly controversial scene features Lena kissing her lover's (Borje's) flaccid penis. Released in Sweden in October 1967, it was released in the U.S. in March 1969, immediately attracting a ban in Massachusetts for being pornographic, with the Boston Police Department seizing the film reels from the Symphony Cinemas I & II on Huntington Avenue. After proceedings in the United States District Court for the District of Massachusetts (Karalexis v. Byrne, 306 F. Supp. 1363 (D. Mass. 1969)), the United States Court of Appeals for the Second Circuit, and the Supreme Court of the United States (Byrne v. Karalexis, 396 U.S. 976 (1969) and 401 U.S. 216 (1971)), the Second Circuit found the film not to be obscene.

An arsonist set a fire in the Heights Theatre in Houston during the film's run there.

Box office
The film was popular at the box office and was the 12th most popular film in the United States and Canada in 1969 and the highest-grossing foreign-language film in the United States and Canada of all-time with a gross of $20,238,100. It was number one at the US box office for two weeks in November 1969.  One reason it did so well was that it became popular among film stars to be seen going to the film. News of Johnny Carson seeing the film legitimized going to see it despite any misgivings about possible pornographic content. Jacqueline Onassis went to see the movie, judo-felling an awaiting news photographer, Mel Finkelstein, alerted by the theatre manager, while leaving the theatre during the showing.

Critical reception

Contemporary
Initial reception to Curious Yellow was divided. Vincent Canby of The New York Times referred to it as a "Good, serious movie about a society in transition," and Norman Mailer said he felt "like a better man" after having seen it. Conversely, Rex Reed described the film as "about as good for you as drinking furniture polish" and Roger Ebert of the Chicago Sun-Times lambasted it as "a dog... a real dog" and "stupid and slow and uninteresting.". Rex Reed said the movie was "vile and disgusting" and Sjöman was "a very sick Swede with an overwhelming ego and a fondness for photographing pubic hair", but Norman Mailer described it as "one of the most important pictures I have ever seen in my life".

Retrospective
In recent years, Yellow has received some reappraisal, thanks in part to Gary Giddins, who authored the 2003 essay accompanying the Criterion Collection DVD release, and a review by Nathan Southern on the All Movie Guide website. Southern assesses the picture as "a droll and sophisticated comedy about the emotional, political, social, and sexual liberation of a young woman... a real original that has suffered from public incomprehension since its release and is crying out for reassessment and rediscovery.".

As of August 2015,  I Am Curious (Yellow) received a 52% rating based on 25 reviews, 13 "fresh" and 12 "rotten" on the review aggregate website Rotten Tomatoes.

Awards and honors

Nyman won the award for Best Actress at the 5th Guldbagge Awards for her role in this film and I Am Curious (Blue).

In popular culture
Various television series have episodes with similar titles, such as Get Smart series finale "I Am Curiously Yellow"; Moonlighting ("I Am Curious, Maddie"); The Simpsons ("I Am Furious (Yellow)"); That Girl ("I Am Curious Lemon"); Ed, Edd n Eddy ("I Am Curious Ed"); and The Partridge Family ("I Am Curious...Partridge").

In the Mad Men seventh season episode "The Strategy", Don Draper references having just seen this movie in a theatre.

Episode 285 of This American Life featured a story called "I Am Curious, Jello," which followed up on the censorship trial between Los Angeles prosecutor Michael Guarino and Dead Kennedys singer Jello Biafra two decades after the case was thrown out of court.

American car manufacturer Plymouth introduced a special order color for 1971. "Curious Yellow" is a vibrant greenish yellow, one of their "High-Impact" colors.

The eleventh studio album by the English post-punk band The Fall makes reference to the film in its title, I Am Kurious Oranj.

References

External links
 I Am Curious (Yellow)   at IMDb
 I Am Curious (Yellow) at Rotten Tomatoes
Still Curious an essay by Gary Giddins at the Criterion Collection
 
 Byrne v. Karalexis

1967 films
1960s avant-garde and experimental films
1967 drama films
Swedish avant-garde and experimental films
1960s erotic drama films
1960s Swedish-language films
Films directed by Vilgot Sjöman
Adultery in films
Swedish black-and-white films
Films about sexually transmitted diseases
Films about filmmaking
Films about Martin Luther King Jr.
Films set in Stockholm
Films shot in Sweden
Censored films
Obscenity controversies in film
Self-reflexive films
Sexual revolution
Works subject to a lawsuit
Swedish erotic drama films
Film censorship in the United States
Film censorship in Sweden
Film controversies in the United States
Film controversies in Sweden
1960s Swedish films